The 1992 Belgian Grand Prix was a Formula One motor race held at Spa-Francorchamps on 30 August 1992. It was the twelfth race of the 1992 Formula One World Championship.

The 44-lap race was won by Michael Schumacher, driving a Benetton-Ford. This was the first Grand Prix win for a German driver since Jochen Mass at the 1975 Spanish Grand Prix, and the first of an eventual record 91 Grand Prix wins for Schumacher (since eclipsed by Lewis Hamilton). New World Champion Nigel Mansell finished second in his Williams-Renault with teammate Riccardo Patrese third, thus securing the Constructors' Championship for Williams.

This race marked Scuderia Ferrari's 500th start in a World Championship event as a team. It also marked the last race for the Andrea Moda team.

Pre-race
There was no pre-qualifying session at this race after the Brabham team did not arrive due to financial problems and the impending sale of the team. This left thirty cars, the maximum allowed in the main qualifying sessions.

Emanuele Naspetti made his Grand Prix debut for the March team, replacing Paul Belmondo.

Qualifying

Qualifying report
Ligier driver Érik Comas was injured and briefly knocked unconscious in a heavy crash during practice on Friday and was advised by doctors not to drive again over the weekend, so he was withdrawn from qualifying. Ayrton Senna encountered Comas's car on the race track, stopped to help him, and cut off the car's engine to reduce the risk of fire. Comas later credited this with likely having saved his life. Gerhard Berger had a 160mph crash down the hill in the wet during practice on the entrance to Eau Rouge with the back of the car catching fire, although he was uninjured.

Aside from Comas, the other three non-qualifiers included Minardi driver Christian Fittipaldi, returning after four races missed through injury. Also failing to qualify were the two Andrea Moda cars, this being the first time both cars had been present in the main qualifying sessions. Roberto Moreno could only manage 28th fastest, over five seconds slower than Fittipaldi, with Perry McCarthy 29th after he went off the track at the 170mph Eau Rouge section. McCarthy reported to his team that the car's steering had jammed, and that he suspected the steering rack was flexing. Team boss Andrea Sassetti replied that the team already knew the rack was faulty because it had previously been fitted to Moreno's car, and he had reported the same problem. McCarthy quit the team after the Friday qualifying session.
Moreno was a sole entry in a wet Saturday qualifying session.
Sassetti was subsequently arrested in the paddock on Saturday afternoon on allegations of forging documents and fraud.

Qualifying classification

Race

Race report
At the start before La Source, Gerhard Berger failed to get away from sixth position and retired after an immediate transmission problem which put him out straight away. Mansell attacked and passed Senna at the end of the second lap with Patrese following suit. Then it began to rain and almost everybody pitted for wets. In the early stages of the race, Senna showed strong pace, briefly leading from the Williams. Then, when rain fell and the other front-runners made pit stops for rain tyres, the Brazilian gambled on the rain stopping and thus stayed out. He pitted late and rejoined down in 12th as Alesi went out with a puncture after colliding with Mansell at La Source. Ivan Capelli suffered a dramatic engine failure on lap 26 as he went straight off into the gravel trap at Blanchimont whilst battling Herbert for sixth position. By the time Thierry Boutsen spun off on lap 28 the track was beginning to dry, which meant the Brazilian's gamble had failed, and the subsequent pit stop dropped him to twelfth. He then made a charge through the field, passing Mika Häkkinen's Lotus for fifth on the penultimate lap. Johnny Herbert retired once again with engine problems on lap 43, and was classified 13th. Schumacher took his first Grand Prix win for Benetton by a comfortable margin over both the Williamses of Mansell and Patrese after they both suffered engine problems in the closing laps (Mansell with a broken exhaust). The Williams duo were able to finish second and third ahead of Brundle in the other Benetton, Senna in the remaining McLaren and Häkkinen in the remaining Lotus securing the final point.

Eighteen cars were classified as finishers, the highest number for the season.

Race classification

Championship standings after the race
Bold text indicates the World Champions.

Drivers' Championship standings

Constructors' Championship standings

References

Belgian Grand Prix
Belgian Grand Prix
Grand Prix